Joseph Hilton Smyth (4 December 1901 – 1972) was an American publisher and pulp author. He and two associates, Walker Gray Matheson and Irvine Harvey Williams, in connection with their publishing activities, were convicted in 1942 for acting as agents for the Japanese government without registering with the State Department.

Publishing
In 1940 he and his associates acquired a number of magazines, using $125,000 funds supplied by the Japanese government.  The agreement was to publish pro-Japanese stories.  After the three were convicted of being unregistered agents for the Japanese government, the titles ceased, though at least one (North American Review) was later revived.

In the 1960s he was co-publisher of the Saturday Review of Literature.

Novels

 President's Agent (1963) writing as Joseph Hilton
 Angels in the Gutter (1955) writing as Joseph Hilton

In addition to novels, Smith also published an autobiography, To Nowhere and Return, prior to his conviction.

References

1901 births
1972 deaths
20th-century American novelists
American publishers (people)
American male novelists

20th-century American businesspeople
20th-century American male writers